Diwana or Diwāna or Diwana Thana is a city in Balochistan province of Pakistan. It is on the border with Sindh.

Notes

References

 

Populated places in Balochistan, Pakistan